Semiotus imperialis is a species of beetle belonging to the family Elateridae.

Description
Basic colour of the body varies from fulvus to luteus. The head shows two small black spot, respectively in the middle of the anterior and the posterior border. Pronotum has a reddish median longitudinal stripe and two black marginal maculae in addition to two irregular longitudinal streaks. The elytra have a glabrous surface with fine interstrial punctures and two spines on each apex.

Distribution
This species can be found in southern Peru, Colombia and Venezuela.

References
 Samuel A. Wells (2007) Natural History Museum of Los Angeles County
 Elateridae in SYNOPSIS OF THE DESCRIBED COLEOPTERA OF THE WORLD

External links
 Semiotus imperialis on Flickr

Elateridae
Beetles of South America
Arthropods of Colombia
Beetles described in 1844